Jalu Kurek (29 February 1904, in Kraków – 10 November 1983, in Rabka) was a Polish poet and prose writer, one of the figures of the so-called Kraków avant-garde. He was a laureate of the Young Poland Literary Award for the novel "Grypa szaleje w Naprawie" ("Influenza ravages Naprawa").

He graduated from the Bartłomiej Nowodworski High School in Kraków and obtained a Master's degree in Philosophy from Jagiellonian University. He continued his studies at University of Naples. He was a lifelong friend of Filippo Tommaso Marinetti.

1904 births
1983 deaths
Jagiellonian University alumni
20th-century Polish poets